Tavakkolabad-e Zeh Kalut (also Romanized as Tavakkolābād-e Zeh Kalūt; also known as Tavakkolābād) is a village in Jazmurian Rural District, Jazmurian District, Rudbar-e Jonubi County, Kerman Province, Iran. At the 2006 census, its population was 51, in 9 families.

References 

Populated places in Rudbar-e Jonubi County